Rod A. A. Zimmer (December 19, 1942 – June 7, 2016) was a Canadian senator, businessman, and philanthropist. He was also a significant fundraiser for the Liberal Party of Canada. He resigned suddenly from the Senate due to ill health on August 2, 2013.

Early life
Born in Kuroki, Saskatchewan, he received a Bachelor of Commerce degree from the University of Saskatchewan in 1973.

Business career
From 1979 to 1983, he was Vice President of Corporate Communications for CanWest Capital Corporation. He was then Director of Marketing and Communications for the Manitoba Lotteries Foundation (1985–1993). From 1989 to 1991, he was president of the Royal Winnipeg Ballet and from 1981 to 1993 he was a member of the board of directors for the Winnipeg Blue Bombers. He served as Vice President for the Festivals for the Pan American Games Society Inc. from 1995 to 1998. Before being appointed to the Senate, he was the President of The Gatehouse Corporation, a position he has held since 1993.

Political career
From 1968 to 1971, Zimmer was an assistant to Cyril MacDonald, the Liberal Minister of Welfare in Saskatchewan, for most of the 1970s he was an assistant to James Richardson, the Minister of Defence. He was the Manitoba chair for the federal Liberal campaign in 1980.

In 1999, Zimmer was reportedly among the final two candidates for the posting of Lieutenant Governor of Manitoba. Prime Minister Jean Chrétien chose the other finalist, Peter Liba.

Zimmer was a member of the fundraising committee for Paul Martin’s leadership campaign in 2003 and revenue chair for the Liberal Party of Canada in Manitoba from 2004 to 2006. After Martin’s resignation, he helped raise funds for Ken Dryden’s leadership campaign.

He was appointed to the Senate of Canada on the recommendation of Prime Minister Paul Martin on August 2, 2005. He officially resigned exactly eight years later in 2013. Auditor General Michael Ferguson determined in 2015 that Zimmer had inappropriately claimed $176,012 in expenses which were not repaid before his death.

Personal life
He married Maygan Sensenberger (born April 15, 1989) on August 27, 2011, in Ottawa, Ontario. During an August 23, 2012 flight, Zimmer and Sensenberger had an argument that required the flight crew to intervene. Sensenberger was arrested and charged with causing a disturbance and uttering threats against Zimmer, as well as endangering an aircraft which was later dropped. A court order forbade Zimmer and Sensenberger from communicating in person, restricting them to only phone and Internet, including Skype. Sensenberger pleaded guilty to causing a disturbance on a flight and was given a 12-month suspended sentence with probation and must seek counselling and an addiction assessment. The charge of uttering threats against Zimmer was withdrawn.

Zimmer suffered ill health in 2013 spending three weeks in hospital with pneumonia during the spring and then continuing to go in and out of hospital with respiratory complaints. He reportedly informed Liberal leader Justin Trudeau in July of his intention to resign due to his health and submitted a resignation letter to the Governor General of Canada on August 2, 2013, the eighth anniversary of his appointment to the Senate, with his resignation taking immediate effect. He was 70 at the time of his departure from the upper house. He died from cancer on June 7, 2016.

References

External links
 

1942 births
2016 deaths
Businesspeople from Manitoba
Businesspeople from Saskatchewan
Canadian philanthropists
Canadian senators from Manitoba
Liberal Party of Canada senators
21st-century Canadian politicians
20th-century philanthropists